Ernst Joubert (born 5 August 1980 in Ceres, Western Cape) is a former South African rugby union player. He played at Number Eight for Saracens in the Aviva Premiership from 2009 to 2015 and was the vice captain of the team. He retired from all rugby at the end of November 2015.

Career

Western Province and Boland Cavaliers

Golden Lions

He moved to Johannesburg to join the  prior to the 2004 season.

He also regularly featured for the  domestically in the Currie Cup competition and a few appearances in the  2009 Vodacom Cup competition.

Saracens

Joubert left South Africa to join English Premiership side Saracens in 2009.

2009–2010 season
He made his debut on 5 September 2009 against London Irish in the London Double Header which finished 18–14 to Saracens. He played the whole match but got a yellow card. Joubert turned out to be a mainstay in the Saracens team with 34 appearances and 10 tries. When the usual Saracens captain Steve Borthwick was injured, Joubert took over the captain's duties for the last two months of the season that included the narrow 33–27 defeat to Leicester Tigers in the 2010 Guinness Premiership Final. In this game, Joubert scored both of the Saracens tries to help Saracens narrowly miss out on victory. Joubert was one of the stars of the Saracens team and was rewarded with a place in the 2010 Guinness Premiership Dream Team with the likes of Chris Ashton and Schalk Brits.

2010–2011 season
Joubert started the 2010–2011 Aviva Premiership season with being named as the vice captain of the Saracens team. He again started most of the team's games in which was a greatly successful season. Ernst was rewarded for his outstanding performances in the season by being named as the Aviva Premiership Player of the Month for February, also his consistent performances earned him a place in the Sky Sports Aviva Premiership Dream Team 2011. Overall he made 30 appearances and scored three tries in helping the Saracens to win the 2011 Aviva Premiership with a 22-18 win over Leicester Tigers.

2011–2012 season
This was Joubert's third season as a Saracens player and he started the season in his usual role as a first team regular. He played 26 games for Saracens in helping them to third place in the league. During the season he scored seven tries for Saracens as they lost in the semi-final to Leicester Tigers.

2012–2013 season
Joubert began his fourth season for Saracens in 2012 and made his 100th appearance for the club in the 15-9 defeat to Munster in the Heineken Cup. Joubert also started for Saracens in their first Aviva Premiership match at their new stadium, Allianz Park, in a 31-11 victory over Exeter Chiefs. During the season, Ernst made a total of 26 appearances for the club, scoring one try. Ernst helped Saracens to the semi-finals of the Aviva Premiership, Heineken Cup and LV Cup where the Saracens team lost in all 3 to Northampton Saints, Toulon and Sale Sharks respectively.

2013–2014 season
This was Joubert's fifth season playing for Saracens where he continued as the club's vice captain. Despite added competition from the signing of England number 8 Billy Vunipola, Joubert continued to be a regular starter for Saracens, making 21 appearances in the season and scoring 1 try. His appearances have helped his club to the semi-final of the LV Cup where they lost to Northampton Saints and to the finals of the Heineken Cup and the Aviva Premiership playing against Toulon and Northampton Saints respectively. Unfortunately Joubert was injured in the Heineken Cup quarter final against Ulster Rugby which meant that he missed the whole of the end of the season including both finals.

2015–2016 season
Joubert retired from all rugby at the end of Saracens' game against Worcester Warriors at Twickenham on 28 November 2015.  Following that he immediately moved back to South Africa.

External links
 Saracens profile

References

1980 births
Living people
People from Ceres, Western Cape
Afrikaner people
South African rugby union players
Golden Lions players
Lions (United Rugby Championship) players
Western Province (rugby union) players
South African expatriate rugby union players
Expatriate rugby union players in England
South African expatriate sportspeople in England
Saracens F.C. players
Rugby union players from the Western Cape
Rugby union number eights